Maher is an interfaith and caste-free Indian non-governmental organisation based near Pune with remote homes in Ranchi, Ratnagiri, Miraj and Ernakulam. The objective of the organisation is to provide shelter and support to destitute women and children. It was founded by Sister Lucy Kurien in 1997 in the village Vadhu Budruk.

History

The Beginning (1991) 
1991, while Sister Lucy was working for the H.O.P.E organisation, a pregnant woman came to her, asking for help. She believed her husband was going to kill her to bring another woman into his house. Sister Lucy couldn't help her, but promised to try and do something for her the following day.

After this incident Sister Lucy decided to found Maher, to help women in such a plight.
It took almost seven years to get the needed support, but on 2 February 1997 in the small village of Vadhu Budruk, on the outskirts of Pune, the first Maher house opened its doors.

Further Development (1997 - 2017) 

Maher began with Sr. Lucy, 1 house, 3 residents, and daunting odds. Today, Maher operates 43 houses served by a loving army of doctors/ social workers/ teachers/ trustees/ business people/ volunteers etc., providing homes for over 1,200 full-time residents (860 children, 300 women including 120 mentally ill women and 71 mentally ill/aged destitute men) in addition to the thousands more reached by community programs such as kindergartens, self-help groups, village libraries, and so on. All are welcome at Maher regardless of religion, gender, caste, color, creed, or social status.

Over a period of only 20 years, over 38,000 people have been impacted with Maher's aid programs, 43 houses have been built (7 for women, 34 for children and 2 for men) and Maher expanded in other states of India: Jharkhand (2008) and Kerala (2009) . Also the aid for Maher increased considerably. More and more people, mainly from Austria, Germany, the United States and the UK, came to support the project. For her work at Maher, Sister Lucy was honoured  with the Nari Shakti Puraskar at the hands of the then President of India, Pranab Mukherjee, DCCIA Award for Excellence in Social Service 2010 Global Women's Leadership Award 2011, Paul Harris Fellow, Vanitha Woman of the Year Award among other prominent awards. Maher and Sister Lucy Kurien have featured several times on Indian television, including the popular show Satyamev Jayate hosted by actor Aamir Khan, and also on Vatican Radio. In 2015, Sister Lucy was invited to attend the Clinton Global Initiative.

In May 2017, Maher was granted a "special consultative status" with the United Nations Economic and Social Council (UN-ECOSOC).

Maher founder, Sister Lucy, has had the opportunity to meet with Pope Francis, Indian Prime Minister Narendra Modi and former US President Bill Clinton on different occasions.

Today (from 2017) 
In 2017, Maher had its 20th anniversary celebration attended by 15,000 people from 10 countries. Former President of India, Pratibha Patil, chairperson, Lila Poonawalla Foundation, Lila Poonawalla and eminent Buddhist nun Jetsunma Tenzin Palmo attended the event on 5 February 2017 at Maher Vatsalyadham,  Avhalwadi, Pune.

Structure 
Maher's activities are grouped into different projects - the three main projects are Mamtadham (Marathi: a place of mother's love), Kishoredham (Marathi: a children's place) and Vatsalyadham (Marathi: a place of love). The organization is led by women leaders - the founder Sister Lucy Kurien and the president Hirabegum Mulla.

Summary of all Maher projects

Philosophy 
Most of Maher's children and women are Hindus, but there are Muslims, Buddhists and Christians too. Maher's emphasis on interfaith is essential in the everyday life, but also at special occasions. In November 2012, Maher celebrated the Hindu festival of light - Diwali - in a special way: people from different religions recited verses and prayed together. 
In order to promote peace, harmony and brotherhood, Maher celebrates all the major festivals of the different religions in India. Maher also takes steps to follow the idea of sustainability: In March 2013 the organization decided to play Holi with natural colours  instead of using the common synthetic colours.

References

Further reading 
 
 Maher, a roof over the heads of destitute women & children, 2011 interview with Sister Lucy by Bhagyashree Kulthe
 Ray of Light in India: A Conversation with Sister Lucy Kurien, 2010 interview with Sister Lucy by Elyssa Paige
 The Season Of Blossom, The story of Savita Ashok Tribhuvan (Article by Devjani Roy)
 The Website of Maher Ashram NGO, Read more about Maher

Human rights organisations based in India
Children's charities based in India
Organizations established in 1997
1997 establishments in Maharashtra
Women's organisations based in India
Charities based in India
Women's shelters
Homeless shelters
Orphanages in India